The Milholland Legal Eagle is an American high wing, strut-braced, single engine, tractor configuration, conventional landing gear-equipped ultralight aircraft that is available as plans from Better Half VW of Brookshire, Texas, and also produced in kit form by J&N Bolding Enterprises of Baytown, Texas, and is intended for amateur construction.

The Legal Eagle is so named because it is capable of being built in compliance with the United States FAR 103 Ultralight Vehicles regulations, even when equipped with a four-stroke engine.

Design and development
The Legal Eagle features an open cockpit and is powered by a  Half VW engine.

The design features a fuselage of welded 4130 steel tubing, mated to an all-wood wing made from spruce (and derived from the Mini-MAX). The struts and tail surfaces are made from 6061 T6 aluminium tubing. The flying surfaces are covered with doped aircraft fabric. The rear fuselage is normally left as an open truss structure to save weight and to ensure that the aircraft does not exceed the FAR 103 maximum speed of 55 knots (102 km/h; 63 mph). Like the fuselage, the taildragger landing gear is sprung steel. The XL wing is reportedly designed for easy-but-infrequent detachment (e.g.: seasonal relocation) by two people.

The aircraft has been developed into several variants of the basic design including the XL version for larger pilots and a two-seat ultralight trainer and light-sport aircraft.

Variants

Legal Eagle
Basic model with a  empty weight, powered by a  Half VW engine
Legal Eagle XL
Model for larger pilots with a wider and taller seat, greater wing area and longer tail.  empty weight
Double Eagle
Model with two seats in side-by-side configuration with a  empty weight and a  gross weight. Designed as an ultralight trainer and Light Sport Aircraft. Powered by a  Volkswagen air-cooled engine giving a  cruise speed.

Specifications (Legal Eagle)

See also

References

External links

Legal Eagle official website
Double Eagle official website

1990s United States ultralight aircraft
Light-sport aircraft
Single-engined tractor aircraft
High-wing aircraft
Conventional landing gear